The following television stations broadcast on digital channel 46 in the United States:

 K46HZ-D in Bonners Ferry, Idaho, to move to channel 17
 K46KI-D in Woody Creek, Colorado, to move to channel 14

The following stations, which are no longer licensed, formerly broadcast on digital channel 46 in the United States:
 K46BY-D in Capulin, etc., New Mexico
 K46FB-D in Austin, Nevada
 K46HW-D in Preston, Idaho
 K46MX-D in Lowry, South Dakota
 KHLU-CD in Honolulu, Hawaii
 KMKI-LD in Cedar Falls, Iowa
 W46AX-D in Bryson City, North Carolina
 W46EO-D in Culebra, Puerto Rico
 W46IT-D in Port Henry, New York
 WQVC-CD in Greensburg, Pennsylvania
 WUEM-LD in Athens, Georgia
 WWEK-LD in Augusta, Georgia

References

46 digital